The Best Thing I Ever Ate, an American television show, premiered on June 22, 2009, on Food Network in the United States. In 2017, the series transferred to Cooking Channel for one season of compilations from the previous six seasons, then with new episodes in its eighth season. As of 2021, eleven seasons have aired, for a total of 143 episodes. (This does not include the eight-episode special series All-Star Best Thing I Ever Ate that aired on Food Network in 2020.) The show features renowned chefs like Bobby Flay, Guy Fieri, and Ted Allen talking about their favorite dishes in specific categories.

Series overview 

† - NOTE: The listed airdates for Seasons 9 and 10 (via the COOKING CHANNEL GO App) have some overlap.

Episode list

Season 1: 2009

Season 2: 2009–2010

Season 3: 2010

Season 4: 2010–2011

Season 5: 2011

Season 6: 2011

Season 7: 2017 (compilations)

Season 8: 2017–2018

Season 9: 2018–2019

Season 10: 2018-2019

Season 11: 2019-2020

Lists of cooking series episodes